Carla Cristina Marins (born 7 June 1968) is a Brazilian actress.

Career 
It was at school that she discovered her calling. Marins, since childhood kept saying she wanted to be a pediatrician, but she would really love to act. She realized that at age 14 when she was chosen to do the lead role of The Ox and the Donkey to Bethlehem, by Maria Clara Machado. After that, Carla Marins decided she wanted to be an actress.

At 16, with the support of her parents, Marins started investing in career and made several tests to commercial. Her first job was an advertisement for McDonald's. Made the film for TV and radio voiceover. At the same time, she began to attend drama schools and learned that the Globo was in need of youth to participate in the novel Hipertensão. How did the course with the interpretation of Wolf Maya, he invited her to join the test and passed. She posed nude at 24 years for the anniversary edition of Playboy magazine in 1992.

Marins participated in telenovelas like Bambolê, Pedra sobre Pedra, Tropicaliente, História de Amor, A Indomada, Porto dos Milagres, among other.

In 2002 and 2008, Marins appeared in episodes of A Grande Família, Sítio do Picapau Amarelo and show Faça Sua História.

In 2010 she starred in the telenovela Uma Rosa com Amor. Inspired by the story of Vicente Sesso - appears in the Globe of October 18, 1972 and July 3, 1973, the new version which aired on SBT was written by Tiago Santiago in collaboration with Renata Dias Gomes and directed by Del Rangel.

In 2011, she returned to Globo, where she played the nurse in the telenovela Amanda Morde & Assopra. In 2017, the actress signs with RecordTV to make the novel Apocalipse.

Personal life 
Marins is married to Hugo Baltazar, her personal trainer since 2006, who has a son Leon. Marins is associated with the Movimento Humanos Direitos.

Filmography

Television

Films

Theater

References

External links 

1968 births
Living people
Brazilian television actresses
Brazilian telenovela actresses
People from Campos dos Goytacazes